Senator Hendrick may refer to:
John Kerr Hendrick (1849–1921), Kentucky State Senate
Lloyd Hendrick (1908–1951), Louisiana State Senate

See also
Senator Hendricks (disambiguation)